Kryukovo is a rural locality (a selo) and the administrative center of Kryukovskoye Rural Settlement, Borisovsky District, Belgorod Oblast, Russia. The population was 919 as of 2010. There are 9 streets.

Geography 
Kryukovo is located 9 km north of Borisovka (the district's administrative centre) by road. Chulanovo is the nearest rural locality.

References 

Rural localities in Borisovsky District
Grayvoronsky Uyezd